Luisa Elizabeth Valverde Melendres (born 4 July 1991) is an Ecuadorian freestyle wrestler. She is a two-time gold medalist at the South American Games. She also won medals at the Pan American Wrestling Championships. She represented Ecuador at the Pan American Games in 2011, 2015 and 2019. She also won the gold medal in her event at the 2022 Bolivarian Games.

Career 

She won one of the bronze medals in the women's 51kg event at the 2010 South American Games held in Medellín, Colombia.

She won the gold medal in the 55kg event at the 2014 Pan American Wrestling Championships held in Mexico City, Mexico. At the 2017 Pan American Wrestling Championships held in Lauro de Freitas, Brazil, she won one of the bronze medals in the 53 kg event.

In March 2020, she competed at the Pan American Olympic Qualification Tournament held in Ottawa, Canada hoping to qualify for the 2020 Summer Olympics in Tokyo, Japan. She did not qualify at this tournament and she also failed to qualify for the Olympics at the 2021 World Olympic Qualification Tournament held in Sofia, Bulgaria.

She won the silver medal in her event at the 2021 Dan Kolov & Nikola Petrov Tournament held in Plovdiv, Bulgaria. In May 2021, she won the silver medal in the women's 53 kg event at the 2021 Pan American Wrestling Championships held in Guatemala City, Guatemala. A month later, she was able to qualify to represent Ecuador at the 2020 Summer Olympics after qualified wrestler Pak Yong-mi of North Korea was no longer able to compete. Due to COVID-19, North Korea's decided to withdraw entirely from the 2020 Summer Olympics. She competed in the women's 53 kg event. She won her first match against Maria Prevolaraki of Greece and she was then eliminated in her next match by Bat-Ochiryn Bolortuyaa of Mongolia.

Two months after the Olympics, she lost her bronze medal match in the women's 53 kg event at the 2021 World Wrestling Championships held in Oslo, Norway. She won the silver medal in her event at the 2022 Pan American Wrestling Championships held in Acapulco, Mexico.

She won the gold medal in her event at the 2022 Bolivarian Games held in Valledupar, Colombia. She was eliminated in her first match in the 55kg event at the 2022 World Wrestling Championships held in Belgrade, Serbia. She won the gold medal in her event at the 2022 South American Games held in Asunción, Paraguay.

She won the silver medal in the women's 55kg event at the Grand Prix de France Henri Deglane 2023 held in Nice, France.

She won one of the bronze medals in the women's 57kg event at the 2023 Ibrahim Moustafa Tournament held in Alexandria, Egypt. She won the gold medal in her event at the 2023 Dan Kolov & Nikola Petrov Tournament held in Sofia, Bulgaria.

Achievements

References

External links 

 

Living people
1991 births
People from Babahoyo
Ecuadorian female sport wrestlers
Pan American Games competitors for Ecuador
Wrestlers at the 2011 Pan American Games
Wrestlers at the 2015 Pan American Games
Wrestlers at the 2019 Pan American Games
South American Games medalists in wrestling
Competitors at the 2010 South American Games
Competitors at the 2018 South American Games
Competitors at the 2022 South American Games
South American Games gold medalists for Ecuador
South American Games bronze medalists for Ecuador
Pan American Wrestling Championships medalists
Wrestlers at the 2020 Summer Olympics
Olympic wrestlers of Ecuador
21st-century Ecuadorian women